(Praise your good fortune, blessed Saxony), BWV 215, is a secular cantata by Johann Sebastian Bach.

History and words 

Bach wrote several works for celebrations of the Leipzig University, Festmusiken zu Leipziger Universitätsfeiern. The Neue Bach-Ausgabe has detailed background information about the events around the composition and first performance of this cantata, collected by Werner Neumann. August III, Elector of Saxony and of Poland, had announced his presence in Leipzig from 2 to 6 October 1734, on short notice. As the anniversary of his election as king on 5 October fell during this time, students of the University of Leipzig planned to perform a procession with torches and evening music on that day. The cantata text was written by Johann Christoph Clauder. He refers to the events of the last months. While other congratulatory cantatas often use allegorical figures, this work concentrates on the king and his qualities. When Augustus II the Strong died, August III followed him as both elector and king, but had to secure the throne against partisans of Stanisław I Leszczyński.

Bach composed the music, probably in no more than three days. He used the first movement of his 1732 cantata Es lebe der König, der Vater im Lande, BWV Anh 11, set for two four part choirs, as a basis for the opening chorus. It seems likely that Bach also used other earlier music, but no specific pieces have been identified.

A chronicle of Leipzig written by Johann Salomon Riemer reports the performance of the cantata on 5 October, in front of the Apel House, the Elector's palace in Leipzig, after a torch-light procession of six hundred students. The Elector and his family remained at the window as long as the music lasted and were pleased ("herzlich wohlgefallen"). 700 copies of the text were printed. The following day, the chronicle reports the death from a stroke of the trumpeter Gottfried Reiche, "Senior der Mus. Stadt Compagnie" (senior of the town music company), who had played first trumpet in the cantata. Possibly "over-exertion and/or the inhalation of smoke from the torches" played a role.

Bach used the seventh movement, the soprano aria , as the basis for a bass aria in his Christmas Oratorio, Part V, . He used the first movement as the basis for the "" of his Mass in B minor.

Scoring and structure 

The cantata in nine movements is scored for three soloists, soprano, tenor and bass, two four-part choirs, and a festive orchestra of three trumpets and timpani, two flauto traverso, two oboes, two violins, viola and basso continuo.

 Chorus: 
 Recitative (tenor): 
 Aria (tenor): 
 Recitative (bass): 
 Aria (bass): 
 Recitative (soprano): 
 Aria (soprano): 
 Recitative (soprano, tenor, bass): 
 Chorus:

Music 

The opening chorus employs a double choir, unique in Bach's surviving cantatas. The movement begins with an instrumental ritornello and is in da capo form. The choir enters in a unison statement. While the model had an upbeat of one note, it is a run of four notes here. The voices change between unison, homophonic seven-part sections and imitation. Musicologist Julian Mincham notes that Bach "makes great play of the dramatic interjections of one choir, often using the initial motive, against the uninterrupted flowing counterpoint of the other". The trumpets are silent in the middle section, where "Bach continues to play the two choirs off against each other before they unite, as the people are encouraged to do, at the end of this section".

In the following two movements, recitative and aria, the tenor is accompanied by two oboes. The aria suggests the "aggression of war". The bass aria is a "rage aria" like in an opera seria. A soprano aria, accompanied by two flutes, appeals to the "king's grace, mercy and love for his subjects". All three soloists participate in a final recitative. The closing chorus provides "cheerful but undemanding conclusions".

Selected recordings 

 J.S. Bach: Kantate BWV 215 · Sinfonien aus Kantaten, Helmuth Rilling, Gächinger Kantorei, Figuralchor der Gedächtniskirche Stuttgart, Bach-Collegium Stuttgart, Erna Spoorenberg, Werner Krenn, Erich Wenk, Cantate-Musicaphon 1966
 J.S. Bach: Kantaten Preise dein Glücke, gesegnetes Sachsen BWV 215; Dem Gerechten muß das Licht BWV 195, Karl-Friedrich Beringer, Windsbacher Knabenchor, Collegium Musicum of the Westdeutscher Rundfunk, Barbara Schlick, Paul Elliott, Stephen Varcoe, Rondeau Production 1986
 J.S. Bach: Complete Cantatas Vol. 4, Ton Koopman, Amsterdam Baroque Orchestra & Choir, Els Bongers, Paul Agnew, Klaus Mertens, Antoine Marchand 1996
 Bach: Secular Cantatas BWV 208 & 215, Gustav Leonhardt, Choir & Orchestra of the Age of Enlightenment, Monika Frimmer, John Elwes, David Wilson-Johnson, Philips 1996

Notes

References

Sources 

 
 
 Cantata BWV 215 Preise dein Glücke, gesegnetes Sachsen: history, scoring, sources for text and music, translations to various languages, discography, discussion, bach-cantatas website
 Preise dein Glücke, gesegnetes Sachsen: history, scoring, Bach website 
 BWV 215 Preise dein Glücke, gesegnetes Sachsen: English translation, University of Vermont
 BWV 215 Preise dein Glücke, gesegnetes Sachsen: text, scoring, University of Alberta

Secular cantatas by Johann Sebastian Bach
1734 compositions
Leipzig University